Shaderwan Code is a Bosnian folk music supergroup formed in Zagreb, Croatia in 2006. The group is formed a friendly match between the rock band Zabranjeno Pušenje and the Zagreb Mosque Choir Arabeske. The group's name refers to a law book of shadirvan. The band's songs harbors folk tradition of the Western Balkans, Bosnian root music, Islamic poetics (ilahia) of the Bosnians and Bosnian Muslims, a concept of rock and roll as primarily progressive music open to various music influences, but also a classic jazz sound.

History 
Zabranjeno Pušenje and the Zagreb Mosque Choir Arabeske has been collaborating on various recordings since 2001. At the first, Arabeske Choir featured on the Zabranjeno pušenje song "Lijepa Alma" (Bog vozi Mercedes, 2001). The collaboration of the popular rock band and the Zagreb Mosque choir came to peak during the writing and formation of the film score for the 2006 Bosnian action comedy film Nafaka, directed by Jasmin Duraković. In that occasion the Shaderwan Code was formed. Sejo Sexon, the bandleader and songwriter of Zabranjeno pušenje, has already been incorporating ilahia, Islamic religious songs, in musical arrangements for his band. The songs "Test za džennet" (Fildžan viška, 2001) and "Lijepa Alma" (Bog vozi Mercedes, 2001) before, and "Domovina" and "Laku noć stari" (both Hodi da ti čiko nešto da, 2006) after the 2006 film score collaboration with Arabeske Choir, can be regarded as an inauguration for Shaderwan Code. 

In 2011, the group released their debut album Kad procvatu behari. The record is produced by Sejo Sexon, Branko Trajkov and Paul Kempf. Kad procvatu behari was produced two singles; "Puče puška" and "Kad procvatu behari".

In 2018, the group released their second studio album Ah, što ćemo ljubav kriti. The record is produced by Sejo Sexon, Branko Trajkov, Paul Kempf and Toni Lović. On January 19, 2018, the band released the first single called "Akšam" on their YouTube channel.

Members

Current 
 Sejo Sexon – rhythm guitar
 Branko Trajkov – drums, electric guitar, percussions
 Paul Kempf – keyboards
 Alma Srebreniković – vocals
 Amina Kazaferović – vocals
 Belma Hadžović – vocals
 Merima Salkić – vocals
 Selma Ibrulj – vocals
 Robert Boldižar – violin
 Mario Perčinić – bass

Discography

Studio albums 
Kad procvatu behari (2011)
Ah, što ćemo ljubav kriti (2018)

References

External links 

Shaderwan Code at Discogs
Zabranjeno Pušenje
Zagreb Mosque Choir Arabeske

Zabranjeno pušenje
2006 establishments in Croatia
Bosnia and Herzegovina musical groups
Croatian musical groups
Musical groups established in 2006
Sevdalinka